Service de sécurité incendie de l'agglomération de Longueuil (SSIAL) is responsible for fire and rescue operations in Longueuil, Brossard, Saint-Lambert, Saint-Bruno-de-Montarville and Boucherville, Quebec, Canada.

Longueuil Fire Department

History

In 2002, as the result of provincially mandated municipal mergers, the 8 existing suburbans fire services were merged with that of the City of Longueuil to form the SSIAL, which now serves around 400,000 people.

List of predecessor departments

Boucherville Fire Department
Brossard Fire Department
Greenfield Park Fire Department
Lemoyne Volunteer Fire Department
Longueuil Fire Department
Saint-Bruno Fire Department
Saint-Hubert Fire Department
Saint-Lambert Fire Department

Trucks
The SSIAL(ALFD) has nearly 30 aerials and pumpers.

Operations
The SSIAL comprises the following operating divisions:

 Division Sud
 Station 31 (Vieux-Longueuil borough) 2205, rue Saint-Georges, Le Moyne
 Station 32 (Saint-Hubert borough) (closed) 
 Station 33 (Greenfield-Park borough) 1510, rue Bellevue, Greenfield-Park
 Station 34 (Saint-Hubert) 2980, boulevard Moïse-Vincent, Saint-Hubert
 Station 41 (City of Saint-Lambert) 55, avenue Argyle, Saint-Lambert
 Station 43 (City of Brossard) 3300, boulevard Lapinière, Brossard
 Station 44 (City of Brossard) 3800, boulevard Matte, Brossard
 Division Nord
 Station 11 (City of Boucherville) 600, chemin du Lac, Boucherville
 Station 14 (City of Saint-Bruno-de-Montarville) 1595, rue Montarville, Saint-Bruno-de-Montarville
 Station 21 (Vieux- Longueuil borough) 111, rue Saint-Jean, Longueuil
 Station 22 (Vieux- Longueuil borough) 1920, rue Brébeuf, Longueuil
 Station 23 (Vieux- Longueuil borough) 1700, Boulevard Curé-Poirier Est, Longueuil

See also
 List of fire departments
 Service de police de Longueuil

External links
 Official Site 

Agglomeration de Longueuil
Politics of Longueuil